The Owl is a 1991 American action television film inspired by the 1984 novel of the same name by Bob Forward. The film, intended as a pilot for a series on CBS, was written and directed by Tom Holland, who chose to be credited as "Alan Smithee" on the later extended home video release. The film starred Adrian Paul, Patricia Charbonneau, Brian Thompson, and Erika Flores.

Plot 
Alex L'Hiboux, a ruthless mercenary-cum-vigilante, is known as "the Owl" because he never sleeps. His insomnia comes from a combination of a medical disorder and recurring nightmares of the murder of his wife and daughter. Alex is approached by Lisa, a young girl whose father is missing. She awakens painful memories of his own child, but after some persuasion from a policewoman friend, he agrees to help her.

Cast
Adrian Paul as The Owl
Patricia Charbonneau as Danny Santerre
Brian Thompson as Barkeeper
Erika Flores as Lisa
Jacques Apollo Bolton as Cool Ice
David Anthony Marshall as Bobby B
Billy "Sly" Williams as Gullett
David Selburg as Dr. Clements
Mark Lowenthal as r. Miller
Alan Scarfe as Hutchins
Thomas Rosales Jr. as Morito
Alejandro Quezada as Gossett
Gregory Scott Cummins as Trash
Rick Zumwalt as Packer
Bridget Klappert as Six-year-old
Jill Pierce as Dark Haired Lady
Sondra Spriggs as Black Chick
Chris Hendrie as Wolpert
Josh Holland as Mark Wolpert
Tom Holland as Mugger (uncredited)

Broadcast and home media
The film was broadcast as a television pilot on CBS from 10:45 p.m. to 11:45 p.m. (Eastern Time Zone) on Saturday, August 3, 1991, but was not picked up as a series. The TV broadcast ran 48 minutes, while the later home video release runs 84 minutes. Reviewer Eoin of theactionelite.com explained this difference, writing, "The length was doubled by padding it with deleted scenes (including Holland’s cameo as a rapist), and tedious montages were created utilizing every bit of alternate footage imaginable. Holland was so disgusted by the extended version that he had his directorial credit switched to Alan Smithee – though many video boxes still touted him as the director."

Reception
In a critical review of the film, David Bushman of Variety wrote, "unfortunately, it can't resist the temptation to be cute and sentimental, and thus it often loses momentum."

References

External links 
 

1991 films
American television films
1990s action films
American vigilante films
Films directed by Tom Holland
Films credited to Alan Smithee
Films scored by Sylvester Levay
Television pilots not picked up as a series
1990s American films